Queen's Park Oval is a cricket ground in Port of Spain, Trinidad and Tobago. It is one of the grounds used as by the West Indies cricket team and has been the home ground of Queen's Park Cricket Club since 1896. The ground was first used in the 1890s and first hosted matches by visiting English teams in 1897. The modern ground has a capacity of 25,000 spectators. 

The first Test match was played on the ground in 1930 when the West Indies played England during the first home Test series played by the side. One Day Internationals (ODIs) have been played on the ground since 1983 and Twenty20 Internationals (T20Is) since 2009. Women's international cricket was first played on the ground in 2003.

In cricket, a five-wicket haul (also known as a "five-for" or "fifer") refers to a bowler taking five or more wickets in a single innings. This is regarded as a notable achievement. This article details the five-wicket hauls taken on the ground in official international Test, One Day International and Twenty20 International matches.

The first five-wicket hauls taken on the ground in international matches were taken by West Indian Herman Griffith and Englishman Bill Voce. Both took their wickets during the ground's first Test match in 1930, Griffith taking five wickets for 63 runs (5/63) in the game's first innings and Voce taking 7/70 later in the match. The West Indies spin bowler Jack Noreiga has the best innings bowling figures on the ground, taking 9/95 against India in 1971 on a pitch described by Wisden as "dubious". No five-wicket hauls have been taken in women's international cricket on the ground.

Key

Test Match five-wicket hauls

A total of 79 five-wicket hauls have been taken in Test matches on the ground.

One Day International five-wicket hauls

Five-wicket hauls have been taken in One Day Internationals four times on the ground, the first by West Indian Tony Gray in 1991. The best bowling in an ODI on the ground is the 6/25 taken by New Zealand's Scott Styris in 2002.

Twenty20 International five-wicket hauls

The only five-wicket hauls taken in a T20I match on the ground was achieved by West Indian Darren Sammy in 2010.

Notes

References

External links
International five-wicket hauls at Queens Park Oval, CricInfo

Queen's Park Oval
Queen's Park Oval